Cullen House is a grand estate house in the coastal town of Cullen in Moray, Scotland. 

"Cullen House" may also refer to:
Places
Cullen Homestead Historic District, Crisfield, Maryland, listed on the U.S. National Register of Historic Places (NRHP)
William Cullen Bryant Homestead, Cummington, Massachusetts, NRHP-listed
Whipple-Cullen House and Barn, n Lincoln, Rhode Island, NRHP-listed
Ezekiel Cullen House, San Augustine, Texas, NRHP-listed in San Augustine County
Keyser-Cullen House, Salt Lake City, Utah, NRHP-listed

Fictional places
Cullen House (Twilight), a setting which was home of vampire Edward Cullen and family in Twilight (2008 film)

See also
Victor Cullen Center, Old Administration Building, Sabillasville, Maryland
Victor Cullen School Power House, Sabillasville, Maryland